Atwood or Attwood is the surname of:

 Angela Atwood (1949–1974), founding member of the Symbionese Liberation Army (SLA), American terrorist group which kidnapped Patricia Hearst 
 Brett Atwood, journalist, online editor and academic
 Casey Atwood (born 1980), American former NASCAR driver
 Charles Atwood (disambiguation), multiple people
 Charles B. Atwood (1849–1895), American architect
 Colleen Atwood (born 1948), Academy Award-winning costume designer
 Dave Attwood (born 1987), English rugby player
 David Attwood (film director) (born 1952), English filmmaker
 Donald J. Atwood Jr. (1924–1994), Deputy United States Secretary of Defense under George H. W. Bush
 Donna Atwood (1925–2010), American figure skater
 Duncan Atwood (born 1955), American javelin thrower
 Eden Atwood (born 1969), American jazz musician and intersex rights activist
 Ethel Atwood (1870–?), American musician and orchestra co-founder
 Edwin W. Atwood (1875–1958), American politician
 Frank Atwood (disambiguation), multiple people
 George Atwood (1745–1807), English mathematician, inventor of the Atwood machine and chess player
 Harry Atwood (1884–1967), American engineer, inventor and aviator who landed an airplane on the White House South Lawn
 James Attwood, American businessman and political donor
 Jane Evelyn Atwood (born 1947), American photographer
 Jeff Atwood (born 1970), American software developer and entrepreneur
 Jett Atwood, American animator
 John Leland Atwood (1904–1999), American aerospace engineer and business executive
 Kimball Atwood, American anesthesiologist and skeptic of naturopathy
 Kimball Chase Atwood, American insurance company founder and grapefruit magnate, owner of the Atwood-Blauvelt mansion in Oradell, New Jersey
 Margaret Atwood (born 1939), Canadian novelist and literary critic
 Matthias Attwood (1779–1851), British banker and politician
 Mary Anne Atwood (1817–1910), English writer on hermeticism
 Richard Attwood (born 1940), British racing driver
 Roman Atwood (born 1983), American YouTube prankster and comedian
 Rudy Atwood (1912–1992), American pianist
 Seth G. Atwood (1917–2010), American industrialist, community leader, and horological collector
 Stephen S. Attwood (1897–1965), American engineer and professor
 Thomas Attwood (composer) (1765–1838), English composer and organist
 Thomas Attwood (economist) (1783–1856) British banker, economist, political campaigner and Member of Parliament
 Thomas Warr Attwood ( 1733–1775), English builder, architect and local politician
 Tony Attwood (born 1952), British/Australian psychologist
 Wallace Walter Atwood (1872–1949), American geographer and geologist
 William Atwood (disambiguation), several people

 Cerstie-Marie Attwood, Sussex champion for most pies eaten in 30 mins